Shen Zigao (1895–1982) was an Anglican bishop in China. He was Bishop of Shensi from 1934 to 1947.

Shen Zigao was born in Shanghai, and studied theology and art at St. John's University, Shanghai. He was a pastor at the Nanjing Anglican Church from 1917 to 1934. He also studied at the University of Oxford and the University of Cambridge, and received a Doctor of Theology degree from St. John's in 1934.

Shen advocated the adaptation of traditional Chinese music and art for use in the church. His son, Shen Yifan, became a bishop of the Three-Self Patriotic Movement in 1988.

References

Anglican missionary bishops in China
1895 births
1982 deaths
St. John's University, Shanghai alumni
Alumni of the University of Oxford
Alumni of the University of Cambridge
People from Shanghai
20th-century Anglican bishops in China
Anglican bishops of Shensi